The Greenville Zoo is a zoo in Greenville, South Carolina, United States. The zoo opened in 1960, and is located at 150 Cleveland Park Drive, near Interstate 385, on a  site within Cleveland Park.

The zoo's official website states: "A typical visit would last from an hour to an hour and 30 minutes." The zoo is next to Cleveland Park, which contains picnic tables throughout the site, and offers bicycle and walking paths, tennis and volleyball courts, playgrounds for children, and several shelters available by reservation. The zoo is open daily throughout the year except for Thanksgiving, Christmas, Christmas Eve and New Year's Day.

The Greenville Zoo is accredited by the Association of Zoos and Aquariums (AZA).

History

The zoo was approved by the Greenville City Council in 1957 and construction was started in 1960. The zoo was opened to the public with mostly indigenous animals including bears, deer, bobcat, foxes, ducks and prairie dogs. A monkey dome was constructed in 1962, and 26 colobus monkeys were added to the zoos residents. In the latter part of the 1960s, the zoo was fenced, walkways were paved, and chimpanzee building was added to the exhibits. The zoo also added a sea lions, otters, a macaw and two leopards.

In the 1970s, elephants were brought to the zoo.

In 1984, the zoo was closed for major upgrades. It reopened in 1986 with a new education center, reptile building, gift and refreshment center, South American area, and waterfowl lagoon.

In 2002, the zoo opened the Cub Kingdom preschool playground, followed by an Asian Encounter exhibit in 2003. In 2008, the Masai giraffe exhibit, featuring Autumn and Walter, was opened to the public.

In 2014, Ladybird, a 44-year-old female African elephant, was euthanized after a month-long bout of abdominal pain left her immobile and unable to stand. There were plans for the remaining female African elephant, Joy, to be moved to another zoo, as AZA regulations prohibit zoos from holding single elephants. Joy the elephant died in route to the Cheyenne Mountain Zoo in Colorado. In 2015, the zoo turned the former elephant exhibit into a South American Pampas exhibit, first for a Giant anteater named Moe, later gaining two Rheas from New York's Queens Zoo.

In 2021 a new Amur leopard den was added, followed by the completion and unveiling of Primate Row, state-of-the-art primate enclosures that house four of the five protected primate species at the Greenville Zoo. After several years without an alligator, "Big Al," a twelve-foot-long American alligator became a resident of the Zoo. 14 new Chilean Flamingos and two Southern Screamers were added to the lagoon. A new species was introduced to the Zoo when “Bill & Ted,” the Kunekune Pigs, came in September. The year ended with an inaugural "Holidays at the Zoo" event that helped break attendance and revenue records for December.

Exhibits

The zoo features African lions, Masai giraffes and several species of primates. In addition to the wild animal exhibits, the zoo contains a farm exhibit which features domestic animals and a reptile house featuring lizards, frogs, reptiles, and snakes.

In October 2012, the Greenville Zoo welcomed its first giraffe calf. Kiko was born to Autumn, its female Masai giraffe, that is on a breeding loan from Boston's Franklin Park Zoo. Kiko will stay at the zoo for at least a year before officials at the Franklin Park Zoo determine where his permanent home will be.  In June, Kiko traveled to the Toronto Zoo, making him the first giraffe born in South Carolina to cross into Canada.

On March 14, 2015, the zoo welcomed a baby gibbon, the first born at the Greenville Zoo.  Also on June 21, 2015, the zoo welcomed a baby red panda who was named "Willie" after the country singer Willie Nelson.

Notes

References

External links
 
 

Zoos in South Carolina
Buildings and structures in Greenville, South Carolina
Tourist attractions in Greenville, South Carolina
Zoos established in 1960